Genre Films, usually credited as Kinberg Genre, is a production company founded by screenwriter-producer-director Simon Kinberg.

History 
Genre Films in April 2010 signed a first-look deal with 20th Century Fox, which gave Fox "direct access" to ideas by Kinberg.

Aditya Sood became president of production, and Josh Feldman became director of development.

In December 2013, Genre Films renewed its deal with Fox for three additional years.

In 2016, the studio made its first leap onto television when ABC picked up Designated Survivor to series.

In July 2019, it was announced that Kinberg and his Genre Films would be leaving Fox after 20 years.

Filmography

Film

2010s

2020s

Television

2010s

References

Film production companies of the United States
Television production companies of the United States
Mass media companies established in 2010